Hasanabad (also Romanized as Ḩasanābād) is a village in Abravan Rural District, Razaviyeh District, Mashhad County, Razavi Khorasan Province, Iran. At the 2006 census, its population was 269, in 58 families.

References 

Populated places in Mashhad County